The 1978–79 Portland Trail Blazers season was the ninth season of the Portland Trail Blazers in the National Basketball Association (NBA).

During the offseason, MVP Bill Walton demanded to be traded, citing unethical and incompetent treatment of his and other players' injuries by the Blazers' front office. He did not get his wish and sat out the 1978–79 season in protest, signing with the San Diego Clippers when he became a free agent in 1979.

Before the draft, Larry Bird had just finished his junior year at Indiana State. However, he was eligible to be drafted without applying for "hardship" because his original college class at the Indiana University had graduated. He initially enrolled at Indiana in 1974 but dropped out before the season began. After sitting out a year, he enrolled at Indiana State. Despite being eligible for the draft, he stated that he would return to college for his senior season. His hometown team, the Indiana Pacers, initially held the first overall pick. However, when they failed to persuade him to leave college early, they traded the first pick to the Blazers, who also failed to convince him into signing; ultimately the Blazers used the first pick on Minnesota standout center Mychal Thompson.

As a result, the Blazers fell 13 games from their franchise-best record of the previous year, barely squeezing into the playoffs with a 45–37 record that earned them the sixth and final seed, only two games better than the Clippers.

The Blazers were ousted from the 1979 NBA Playoffs after losing their best-of-three series to the Phoenix Suns, two games to one.

Draft picks

Note:  This is not a complete list; only the first two rounds are covered, as well as any other picks by the franchise who played at least one NBA game.

Roster

Regular season

Season standings

z – clinched division title
y – clinched division title
x – clinched playoff spot

Record vs. opponents

Game log

Playoffs

|- align="center" bgcolor="#ffcccc"
| 1
| April 2
| @ Phoenix
| L 103–107
| Ron Brewer (26)
| Thompson, Lucas (10)
| Lucas, Brewer (5)
| Arizona Veterans Memorial Coliseum12,660
| 0–1
|- align="center" bgcolor="#ccffcc"
| 2
| April 4
| Phoenix
| W 96–92
| Ron Brewer (21)
| Mychal Thompson (17)
| Maurice Lucas (4)
| Memorial Coliseum12,666
| 1–1
|- align="center" bgcolor="#ffcccc"
| 3
| April 6
| @ Phoenix
| L 91–101
| three players tied (16)
| Maurice Lucas (16)
| Maurice Lucas (9)
| Arizona Veterans Memorial Coliseum12,660
| 1–2
|-

Awards and honors
 Mychal Thompson, All-NBA Rookie Team
 Ron Brewer, All-NBA Rookie Team
 Maurice Lucas, NBA All-Defensive Second Team
 Lionel Hollins, NBA All-Defensive Second Team
 Maurice Lucas, NBA All-Star

References

Portland Trail Blazers seasons
Portland
Portland Trail Blazers 1978
Portland Trail Blazers 1978
Portland Trail Blazers
Portland Trail Blazers